Chacha Bhatija is a 1977 Indian Bollywood comedy drama film, written by Salim–Javed and directed by Manmohan Desai. It was the year's fourth hit for Manmohan Desai (Amar Akbar Anthony, Dharam Veer and Parvarish are the other three). It was his second film with Dharmendra (after Dharam Veer). Chacha Bhatija stars Dharmendra, Randhir Kapoor, Rehman, Hema Malini, Yogeeta Bali, Jeevan, Master Satyajeet and Sonia Sahni.

Plot 
Ranvir Singh Teja (Rehman) lives with his family, wife Sita, son Sunder and younger brother-Shanker (Dharmendra). The family lives happily, until Sita dies suddenly. Teja remarried, and his new wife is Sonia (Sonia Sahni), who comes to live with him at his palatial home with her wicked brother, Laxmidas (Jeevan). They have a devious agenda of taking over Teja's property. Soon after marriage, misunderstandings arise, and Shanker is asked to leave the house. These misunderstandings involve Sunder, who also is sent away from the house (to a miserable boarding school) by Teja, who thinks that his brother and son are inciting each other and conspiring against his newly-wedded wife Soniya.

Many years pass. Sunder has grown up to be a conman, and Shanker has become a black-marketeer. They come across each other without knowing each other's identity, and a confrontation takes place. When they realize they are uncle and nephew, they decide to expose Sonia, and open Teja's eyes, who is completely blinded by Sonia's love and will not let anyone come between them.

Cast 
 Dharmendra as Shanker Teja
 Randhir Kapoor as Sunder Teja
 Hema Malini as Mala 
 Yogeeta Bali as Pinky 
 Rehman as Ranvir Singh Teja
 Roopesh Kumar as Kiran
Durga Khote as Mrs. D'Silva
 Indrani Mukherjee as Sita Teja
 Sonia Sahni as Sonia Teja 
 Jeevan as Laxmidas
 Keshto Mukherjee as Kesto
 Dev Kumar as Tony
 Sunder as Police Inspector

Songs 
"Jeena Zaroori Hai Jeene Ke Liye Peena Zaroori Hai" – Asha Bhosle
"Kehte Hain Peenewaale Yeh Gham Ka Jaawaab Hai" – Mohammed Rafi, Shailendra Singh, Asha Bhosle
"Jeena Zaroori Hai Jeene Ke Liye Peena Zaroori Hai" – Kishore Kumar
"Kehte Hain Peenewaale Yeh Gham Ka Jaawaab Hai" – Lata Mangeshkar
"Kyun Bhai Chacha Haan Bhatija" – Mohammed Rafi, Shailendra Singh
"Maa Ne Kaha Tha O Beta" – Shailendra Singh
"Tera Sheeshe Ka Samaan" – Mohammed Rafi, Lata Mangeshkar
"Bhoot Raja Bahar Aaja" - Asha Bhosle

References

External links 
 

1977 films
1970s Hindi-language films
Films directed by Manmohan Desai
Films scored by Laxmikant–Pyarelal
Films with screenplays by Salim–Javed
1970s Urdu-language films